"Here We Go Again" is a swing jazz instrumental recorded by Glenn Miller. The song was released as a 78 single.

Background
"Here We Go Again" was composed by Jerry Gray, the arranger in the Glenn Miller Orchestra. Glenn Miller and His Orchestra released the song as an RCA Victor 78 single, 20-1563-A, backed with "Long Time No See, Baby", words and music by Jack Lathrop and Sunny Skylar. The recording reached no. 25 on the Billboard pop singles chart in April, 1944 in a one-week chart run. The song was also performed by Glenn Miller with the Army Air Force Band.

The instrumental was recorded at Victor Studios in Chicago on Tuesday, July 14, 1942.

This instrumental was part of the last recording session by the Glenn Miller civilian band due to the dispute between the American Federation of Musicians and the recording companies. A ban on recording was imposed by the Union on its members on August 1, 1942, that continued until November 22, 1944, for RCA Victor and Columbia. Decca and several other new companies began recording in October 1943. The instrumental would not be released until 1944.

"Here We Go Again" was the last Top 40 hit that Glenn Miller had during his lifetime.

A V-Disc test pressing of the song was made by the U.S. War Department as VP 1311 – D5TC 274 using a recording from April 29, 1944.

Personnel

On trombones: Glenn Miller, Jimmy Priddy, Paul Tanner, Frank D’Annolfo. On trumpets: Billy May, Steve Lipkins, Dale McMickle, Johnny Best. On reeds: Lloyd “Skippy” Martin, as; Ernie Caceres, as, bar & clt; Wilbur Schwartz, clt & as; Tex Beneke, ts; Al Klink, ts. Rhythm: Chummy MacGregor, p; Bobby Hackett, g; Doc Goldberg, b; and, Maurice Purtill, d.

Album appearances

The song appears on the following Glenn Miller albums:

 The Glenn Miller Story, Vol. 2, RCA, 1990  
 Glenn Miller and the Army Air Force Band: Rare Broadcast Performances From 1943 to 1944, Laserlight, 1990   
 Glenn Miller Live at the Hollywood Palladium: Giants of Jazz, Giants of Jazz Recordings/Saar, 1995   
 Missing Chapters, Vol. 5: The Complete Abbey Road Recordings, Avid, 1996  
 The Lost Recordings, #1, Conifer, 1996
 Red Cavalry March, Vol. 4, Avid, 1996   
 Secret Broadcasts, RCA, 1996
 The 100 Greatest Titles, EMI Music Distribution/Parlophone, 2001  
 The Essential Glenn Miller: Best of Army & Civilian Bands, Metro, 2002 
 The Real ... Glenn Miller: The Ultimate Glenn Miller Collection, RCA Victor, 2013

References

Sources

Flower, John (1972). Moonlight Serenade: A Bio-Discography of the Glenn Miller Civilian Band. New Rochelle, NY: Arlington House. .
Miller, Glenn (1943). Glenn Miller's Method for Orchestral Arranging. New York: Mutual Music Society. ASIN: B0007DMEDQ
Simon, George Thomas (1980). Glenn Miller and His Orchestra. New York: Da Capo paperback. .
Simon, George Thomas (1971). Simon Says. New York: Galahad. .
Schuller, Gunther (1991). The Swing Era: The Development of Jazz, 1930–1945, Volume 2. New York: Oxford University Press. .

External links
Online version. "Here We Go Again" recorded by Major Glenn Miller and the ABAEF at Abbey Road studios in London on November 6, 1944, track 13.

Glenn Miller songs
1944 songs
1944 singles
Instrumentals
Jazz compositions
Songs with music by Jerry Gray (arranger)